Gil Aldema (born 17 September 1928 - 27 September 2014) was an Israeli composer and conductor.

Biography
Gil Aldema was born in Giv'atayim in Mandate Palestine. He graduated from the Jerusalem Academy of Music in Jerusalem and Mannes College of Music in New York.

Aldema taught music at Hadassim youth village. Later he worked as a program producer and arranger for the Israel Broadcasting Authority. He composed and arranged songs for folk-ensembles and choirs.

Awards and recognition
In 2004, Aldema was awarded the Israel Prize, for Hebrew song.

See also
Music of Israel
List of Israel Prize recipients

References

External links
 Menashe Ravina and Shlomo Skolsky (Ed.): Who is who in ACUM. Authors, Composers and Music publishers, biographical notes and principal works. ACUM Ltd., Societe d'Auteurs, Compositeurs et Editeurs de Musique en Israel, 1965.

1928 births
2014 deaths
Jewish Israeli musicians
Israeli people of Ukrainian-Jewish descent
Israeli people of Lithuanian-Jewish descent
Israeli composers
Israeli accordionists
Israel Prize in Hebrew song recipients